Parham railway station was a station located in Parham, Suffolk.

The station opened in 1859 and closed for passenger services in November 1952.

References

External links
 Parham station on navigable 1946 O. S. map

Disused railway stations in Suffolk
Former Great Eastern Railway stations
Railway stations in Great Britain opened in 1859
Railway stations in Great Britain closed in 1952